The Gendarmerie General Command is the national Gendarmerie force of the Republic of Turkey. It is a service branch of the Turkish Ministry of Interior responsible for the maintenance of the public order in areas that fall outside the jurisdiction of police forces (generally in rural areas), as well as assuring internal security along with carrying out other specific duties assigned to it by certain laws and regulations. In wartime, some of its elements can be subordinated to Turkish Land Forces by the President of Turkey.

The Commander of the Gendarmerie reports to the Minister of the Interior.

The Gendarmerie has its roots in the Ottoman Empire military law enforcement organization "Subaşı" (later known as the "Zaptiye"). A similar, earlier force called "Şurta" existed during the medieval Seljuq Empire.

History

Ottoman era

After the abolition of the Janissary  corps of the Ottoman Empire in 1826, military organizations called Asâkir-i Muntazâma-i Mansûre, Asâkir-i Muntazâma-i Hâssa, and, in 1834, Asâkir-i Redîfe were established for security and public order in Anatolia and in some provinces of Rumelia.

As the first use of the term Gendarmerie was in the Assignment Decrees published in the years following the 1839 Edict of Gülhane, it is assumed that the Gendarmerie organization was founded after that year, but the exact date of foundation has not yet been determined. Therefore, the date on which the name Asâkir-i Zaptiye Nizâmnâmesi was adopted, June 14, 1839, is usually considered the foundation date of the Turkish Gendarmerie.

After the 1877–1878 Russo-Turkish War, Ottoman prime minister Mehmed Said Pasha decided to bring police officers from Britain and France to establish a modern law enforcement organization. The Gendarmerie was used to great effect after the 1908 Young Turk Revolution, particularly in Rumelia. In 1909, the Gendarmerie was affiliated with the Ministry of War, and its name was changed to the Gendarmerie General Command.

Gendarmerie units continued their internal security duties as well as taking part in the conflict at various fronts as a part of the Armed Forces during World War I and the Turkish War of Independence.

Republic of Turkey

20th century

The Gendarmerie organization achieved its current legal status on June 10, 1930. In 1939, the Gendarmerie organization was restructured, having three groups: Fixed Gendarmerie Units, Mobile Gendarmerie Units, and Gendarmerie Training Units and Schools.

In 1956, the Gendarmerie General Command was assigned the duties of protecting borders, coasts and territorial waters, and fighting smuggling, which had been previously carried out by the Gümrük Umum Kumandanlığı,  under the Ministry of Customs and Monopoly. In 1957, Gendarmerie Border Units were transformed into brigades, and Gendarmerie Training Brigades were established.

In 1961, Gendarmerie Regional Commands were established. In 1968, the first Gendarmerie Aviation Unit was established in Diyarbakır under the name of Light Helicopter Company Command.

In 1974, Gendarmerie Commando Units and Gendarmerie Aviation Units took part in the Turkish military operations in Cyprus.

In 1988, the duty of protecting the land borders and ensuring their security was assigned to the Land Forces Command, but Gendarmerie General Command still holds the responsibility for some parts of the Iranian and Syrian borders and the whole Iraqi border.

The Gendarmerie Criminal Department was founded in Ankara in 1993 and from 1994, Gendarmerie Regional Criminal Laboratory Superiorities were founded. Crime Scene Examination Teams, Explosive Material Disposal Units, Fingerprints and Palm Prints Branches and Crime Scene Examination Units were also established.

21st century
In 2016, the Gendarmerie General Command was affiliated to the Ministry of Interior.

In 2018, Gendarmerie Special Operations participated in Operation Olive Branch, part of the Turkish involvement in the Syrian Civil War. According to the Syrian Observatory of Human Rights, Turkish Gendarmerie killed 500 Syrian civilians at the turkish-syrian border.

The Gendarmerie General Command currently has a total of 3,600 units, including 3,056 Internal Security Units, 218 Commando Units, 162 Prison Units, 160 Protection Units and four Aviation Units.

Duties 
The duties of the gendarmerie according to the Law No. 2803 on the Organization, Duties and Powers of the Gendarmerie; It is categorized under four main titles as judicial, military, civil and other duties.

Judicial duties 

 Finding crimes and criminals,
 Capturing suspects,
 Transferring evidence judicial authorities,
 Conduct preparatory investigations when instructed to by the public prosecutor,
 Transporting prisoners between jails and courthouses.

Civil duties 

 To ensure that the services for general safety and security are carried out in accordance with the relevant legislation,
 To carry out the services of informing the public about how to protect the society from public order crime, directing children and young people to crime and taking precautionary measures,
 To evaluate the information and statistics about public order crimes, to conduct or have an analysis of the crime and to determine the methods of combating crime to prevent public order crimes by evaluating them,
 Carrying out activities to prevent crime,
 Preventing, pursuing and investigating smuggling,
 External protection of penal institutions and detention centers.

Military duties 

 To perform military services provided by law

Other duties 

 These are duties other than judicial, military and civil duties, such as facility and personal protection and transport security, which must be carried out in accordance with laws and regulations, orders and decisions.

Structure

Commands 
Gendarmerie General Command Headquarters (Ankara)

 Gendarmerie Security Corps Command (Van, Turkey)
 23. Gendarmerie Border Division (Şırnak)
 21. Gendarmerie Border Brigade (Yüksekova)
 1. Gendarmerie Commando Brigade (Çakırsöğüt, Şırnak)
 2. Gendarmerie Commando Brigade (Bornova, Izmir)
 Gendarmerie Training Command (Ankara, İncek, Gölbaşı)
 1. Gendarmerie Training Battalion Command (Aydın)
 2. Gendarmerie Training Battalion Command (Bilecik) 
 3. Gendarmerie Training Battalion Command (Ezine, Çanakkale)
 5. Gendarmerie Training Regiment Command (Gölköy, Kastamonu)
 6. Gendarmerie Commando Training Regiment Command (Kırkağaç, Manisa)
 7. Gendarmerie Commando Training Regiment Command (Yenifoça, İzmir)
 Gendarmerie Combat Training Battalion Command (Seferihisar, İzmir)
 Gendarmerie Transport Battalion Command (Söğüt, Bilecik)
 10. Gendarmerie Training Regiment Command (Bornova, Izmir)
 116. Gendarmerie Private Training Regiment Command (Çanakkale)
 121. Gendarmerie Training Regiment Command (Serinyol, Antakya)
 125. Gendarmerie Training Regiment Command (Safranbolu, Karabük)
Işıklar Gendarmerie NCO High School (Bursa)  ( was established in 1845 as "Mekteb-i Fünun-u İdadi"')
 Gendarmerie Horse and Dog Training Center Command (Nevşehir) (JAKEM)
 Gendarmerie Logistics Command (Güvercinlik, Ankara)
 Gendarmerie Aviation Command (Güvercinlik, Ankara)
 Gendarmerie UAV Command (Elazığ)
 Gendarmerie Special Public Security Command (JÖAK)
Gendarmerie Special Operations  (JÖH)
 Gendarmerie Search and Rescue Battalion Command (JAK)
 Gendarmerie Underwater Search and Rescue Teams (SAK)
 Gendarmerie Public Security Boat Commands (Security and public order services at inland waters are carried out by the Gendarmerie Public Order Boat Commands.)
Village guards
 Prison Gendarmerie Division Commands (There are garrison stations appointed in every prison)
 The Gendarmerie Band Command

Criminal units 
 Provincial Gendarmerie Commands in 81 provinces & in 388 districts.
 The Crime Scene Investigation Teams (CSIT)  (Working under the Provincial and District Gendarmerie Commands systematically examine the crime scene by means of technical and scientific methods; properly gather physical evidences; pack and send them to forensic laboratories.)
 Explosive Ordnance Disposal Teams  ( which have been established in tourism regions, regions with a concentration of terror incidents and big cities, dispose of explosive ordnances.)
 Crime scene investigation units
 Anti-Smuggling and Organized Crime Department (ASOCD)

Other units 
 Gendarmerie Traffic Teams 
 The Gendarmerie Motorcycled Public Order Teams (Round-the-clock at the highways established by the protocols in the responsibility areas of the Gendarmerie General Command.)
 Gendarmerie Dog Teams
 Gendarmerie Environmental Protection Teams (Environmental Protection Teams have been established in order to protect environment, ecological balance and natural life, to protect living species and areas protected by national legislation and international conventions and to prevent environmental pollution.)
 The Gendarmerie Mounted Units (Used in performing patrolling services at resort areas, forestlands, recreation spots and museums (Topkapı Palace), and in performing preventive law enforcement services.)

Ranks

Officers

Other Ranks

The Gendarmerie Museum 

The Gendarmerie Museum is established in order to reflect the developments in periodical order beginning with the foundation of the Gendarmerie organization; to exhibit its activities, heroic deeds, services in the history; to protect all kinds of military cultural assets related to the Gendarmerie by collecting them and to transfer them to the future generations. The Gendarmerie Museum in the Beytepe Lieutenant General İsmail SELEN Quarters in Ankara and is open to public.

Equipment

Handguns
 Yavuz 16
Glock 19
SAR 9
 TP9
K2000 Mega
M1911
Zigana T and F
Beretta 92FS
Browning Hi-Power
Girsan Regard Compact
Girsan Regard MC

Shotguns
 SPAS-12
 Sarsılmaz Cobra & Baba
 Armsan Armtac RS A2/A3

Submachine guns
 HK MP5
 P90
SAR-109T
Uzi

Assault and battle rifles
 AKM
 HK G3
 HK G41
 HK33A4
 M16A1
 M4A1
 MKEK MPT-76
 MKEK MPT-55
Kale KCR-556 New primary rifle of Gendarmerie 43.500 Rifles delivered late 2019
Kale KCR-762
Kale KCR-739
Galil MAR used by Turkish Gendarmarie commando's
SAR 223P
SAR 308 used by Village guards.

Machine guns
 HK23E
 RPK
 M249 SAW
 M2
 MG3
 PKM
 MAG 58
 SAR 762 MT
 Canik M2 QCB
 Type 80
 KMG556

Sniper rifles
 Arctic Warfare
 SVD
 Tac-50
 SR-25
 SR-15 Match
 HK G28
 Armalite M-15T
 IMI Galatz
 Accuracy International AWM
 LMT MWS 308
 MKEK JNG-90
 Robar RC-50
 MacMillan M87R
 PSL (rifle)
 KNT-76

Rocket and grenade launchers
 HK 69
 HK 79
 HK GLM
 M203
 Milkor MGL
 Mk 19
 RPG-7 7B
 AK-40GL
 Kale KGL40
 MKEK 40mm
 MKEK T40

Mortars
 M19
 M29
 Mortier 120mm Rayé Tracté Modèle F1

Vehicles and Aerial vehicles

Surface Combatant

Gallery

See also 
List of General Commanders of the Gendarmerie of Turkey
Constabulary
Gendarmerie
Military equipment of Turkey

Notes

References

External links 

 

Turkey